Hilsa is a sub-division of the Nalanda district in the state of Bihar.

See also
Pawapuri

Cities and towns in Nalanda district